Wincenty Smokowski (19 February 1797, Vilnius — 13 February 1876, Krikonys, Ignalina Raion), was a Polish-Lithuanian painter and illustrator in the Academic and Classical styles. He created portraits, historical scenes, landscapes and genre works; notably realistic, unprejudiced portrayals of Jews and Gypsies.

Biography 
From 1817 to 1822, he studied at Vilnius University where he was a pupil of the English engraver and professor of Fine Art, Joseph Saunders. From 1823 to 1829, he continued at the Imperial Academy of Arts in Saint Petersburg. He was awarded a silver medal in 1825 and a gold medal in 1827 for his version of the death of Epaminondas.

In 1829, he was invited by Jan Rustem to become an assistant professor at the university. He held that position until 1832, when the university was closed by Russian authorities.

In 1836, he graduated from the "Vilnius Medico-Surgical Academy" and worked as a doctor in the area around Švenčionys from 1841 to 1856. After two years in Warsaw, he practiced medicine from his wife's estate at Krikonys, a small village in the Ignalina region.

In addition to his paintings, he provided illustrations for Konrad Wallenrod (1828) and Pan Tadeusz (1860) by Adam Mickiewicz and the poem Anafielas (1846) by Józef Ignacy Kraszewski. He is also known for copying and helping to preserve the 15th century frescoes at Trakai Island Castle.

A street is named after him in the Pašilaičiai district of Vilnius.

Selected paintings

References

Further reading 
 Olga Reichenstein-Mehlerowa, Wincenty Smokowski, Salesian School of Crafts, 1936

External links 

1797 births
1876 deaths
19th-century Polish painters
19th-century Polish male artists
History painters
Genre painters
Polish portrait painters
Artists from Vilnius
Polish illustrators
Lithuanian people of Polish descent
Lithuanian painters
Polish male painters